The Metropolitan Railway K Class consisted of six 2-6-4T steam locomotives, numbered 111 to 116.

Construction
They were built by Armstrong Whitworth in 1925, using parts manufactured at the Royal Arsenal, Woolwich, to the design of the South Eastern and Chatham Railway N class 2-6-0 locomotives and part of a family of 200 or so "mogul" engines designed by Richard Maunsell. Final design was by the Metropolitan Railway's George Hally.  The boilers had been made by Robert Stephenson and Company of Darlington. Some unusual variations included footsteps below the buffer beam and curved handrails at the front either side of the smokebox.

Service
The K Class were used on heavy freight trains along London's Metropolitan Railway mainline, including coal to the power station at Neasden, although there were used on occasional passenger trains. In 1937, all six were transferred to the London and North Eastern Railway (LNER) where they were based at Neasden (LNER) Shed. The LNER numbered them 6158–6163, and classified them as L2 Class.  They were used for passenger services for a short stint in 1938 and 1942 when H2 4-4-4T's were unavailable for maintenance or transferred elsewhere.

Withdrawal
All were withdrawn and scrapped between 1943 and 1948.

References 

K
2-6-4T locomotives
Armstrong Whitworth locomotives
Railway locomotives introduced in 1925
Scrapped locomotives
Standard gauge steam locomotives of Great Britain

Passenger locomotives